The Libin Cardiovascular Institute is an entity of Alberta Health Services and the University of Calgary.  It connects all cardiovascular research, education and clinical care in Southern Alberta. The Institute coordinates the activities of over 1,500 individuals in Southern Alberta.  Of its more than 175 research and clinician members, over 75 are cardiologists, making it the largest heart or cardiovascular institute in Western Canada by that measure.

Individuals affiliated with the Libin Cardiovascular Institute have provided significant leadership and input to the Canadian Heart Health Strategy and Action Plan (CHHS-AP).  Institute participation included Eldon Smith OC, MD, FRCPC who was appointed as Chair of the Steering Committee by the Federal Canadian Minister of Health in 2006, as well as Norman Campbell MD, FRCPC, also a member of the CHHS-AP Steering Committee.

Research
Research within the Libin Cardiovascular Institute extends from basic biomedical and clinical research to health outcomes and care delivery research.  Notable successes include:
 A global change in treatment of arrhythmia as a result of trials led by D. George Wyse.
 APPROACH database and Heart Alert
 Innovative STEMI protocol resulting in mean time to Percutaneous Coronary Intervention of a commendable 62 minutes
 Stephenson Cardiovascular MR Centre, ranking first internationally among CMR centres as measured by research impact factor points, and ranking first in North America among CMR centres as measured by volume of patient studies - a recent publication documented for the first time, the imaging of salvaged heart muscle as a result of a post-MI Intervention.  To date, a White Paper on myocarditis with lead author Dr. Matthias Friedrich of the Stephenson CMR Centre, is the only White Paper ever published by the Journal of the American College of Cardiology.
 Highest 30-day myocardial infarction survival rate in Canada according to the Canadian Institute for Health Information

Education
Programs under the jurisdiction of the Libin Cardiovascular Institute include Cardiology and Cardiovascular Surgery, in addition to contributions to other medical programs as well as graduate studies in the sciences.

The LCI also offers fellowships and/or advanced training in interventional cardiology, electrophysiology, amyloidosis, heart function and cardiac MRI.

Services
The Libin Cardiovascular Institute provides the following services:
 Nursing Units and Diagnostics - Cardiovascular patient services at Calgary area hospitals and private practices.
 Interventional Cardiology - Catheter based treatments of structural heart disease.
 The University of Calgary's Department of Cardiac Sciences - Research of the cardiovascular system.
 Stephenson Cardiovascular MR Centre - Diagnostic facility dedicated exclusively to Cardiovascular Magnetic Resonance (CMR).

Sites
The Libin Cardiovascular Institute is a wide-ranging program of cardiovascular integration which houses a growing list of scientists, clinicians, and researchers from various sites working together to advance the cardiovascular health of Albertans.
 Health Research Innovation Centre (HRIC) contains a new hub for the Libin Cardiovascular Institute's basic scientists.  The space, co-located on the same campus as the Foothills Medical Centre, opened in June 2009. Elements of different University of Calgary Institutes occupy the various floors / areas in this building, as to encourage research integration.
 HRIC Teaching Research & Wellness Building (TRW), opened in Q3 of 2009, houses scientists focused on translational research.  Directly connected to the primary area of HRIC, the spaces have been constructed to encourage interaction between basic and clinical researchers.
 South Health Campus, a $1.5B project completed in 2013, offers a full suite of services relating to cardiovascular health.
 Rockyview General Hospital
 Peter Lougheed Centre
 Alberta Children's Hospital

Notable people
 Eldon Smith OC, FRCPC - Officer of the Order of Canada, penultimate Editor-in-Chief of the Canadian Journal of Cardiology, Chair of the steering committee responsible for developing a new Heart Health Strategy to fight heart disease in Canada.
 D. George Wyse MD, FRCPC, PHD - Professor Emeritus, University of Calgary
 Alvin Libin   LLD- Officer of the Order of Canada, Member of the Alberta Order of Excellence, Chair of the Libin Foundation
 Dr. Todd Anderson, MD, FRCPC, former director of the Libin Cardiovascular Institute and dean of the Cumming School of Medicine at the University of Calgary.
 Dr. Paul Fedak, MD, PHD, director of the Libin Cardiovascular Institute, cardiac surgeon, translational scientist, and senior medical leader at the University of Calgary.

Libin/AHFMR Prize in Cardiovascular Research
 2019 Robert Califf
 2018 Christine Seidman
 2016 Eric N. Olson
 2012 Eric Topol
 2010 A. John Camm
 2008 Valentín Fuster
 2006 The Texas Heart Institute James T. Willerson
 2004 Eugene Braunwald

References

Sources and external links
 Libin Cardiovascular Institute - official web-site

Magnetic resonance imaging
Medical and health organizations based in Alberta
Cardiac electrophysiology
Heart disease organizations
University of Calgary